Pat Riley Basketball is a video game which was released for the Sega Genesis, for the Mega Drive in Japan on March 2, 1990 under the title  and Europe under the title World Cup Basketball. It was released in 1990 in the United States. It was also developed for the Sega Master System, but was never released. Pat Riley was the coach of the Los Angeles Lakers at the time of the game's release. There are two modes and eight different teams to choose from.

Gameplay
There are eight teams to choose from:

Like regulation basketball, there are four quarters, but the player can set the length of the quarters (five, twelve, or twenty minutes per quarter). The game supports two players. Its modes are exhibition and tournament.

References

1990 video games
Basketball video games
Sega video games
Sega Genesis games
Sega Genesis-only games
Cancelled Master System games
Sports video games set in the United States
Multiplayer and single-player video games
Video games based on real people
Cultural depictions of basketball players
Video games developed in Japan